Washington Avenue Historic District may refer to the following places in the United States:

 West Washington Avenue Historic District, Jonesboro, Arkansas, listed on the National Register of Historic Places (NRHP) in Craighead County
 Washington Avenue Historic District (Marietta, Georgia), listed on the NRHP in Cobb County, Georgia
 Washington Avenue Historic District (Evansville, Indiana), NRHP-listed
 Washington Avenue-Main Street Historic District, Greenville, Mississippi, listed on the NRHP in Washington, County Mississippi
 Washington Avenue Historic District (St. Louis, Missouri), NRHP-listed
 Washington Avenue: East of Tucker District, St. Louis, Missouri, listed on the NRHP in Downtown and Downtown West St. Louis, Missouri
 Washington Avenue Historic District (Elyria, Ohio), listed on the NRHP in Lorain County, Ohio
 Washington Avenue Historic District (Philadelphia), Pennsylvania, NRHP-listed
 Washington Avenue and Florida Avenue Historic District, Union City, Tennessee, listed on the NRHP in Obion County, Tennessee
 Washington Avenue Historic District (Fredericksburg, Virginia), NRHP-listed
 Parkersburg High School-Washington Avenue Historic District, Parkersburg, West Virginia, NRHP-listed
 Washington Avenue Historic District (Cedarburg, Wisconsin), NRHP-listed
 Washington Avenue Historic District (Oshkosh, Wisconsin), listed on the NRHP in Winnebago County, Wisconsin

See also
 Washington Avenue (disambiguation)
 Washington Street Historic District (disambiguation)
 Washington Historic District (disambiguation)